This is a comprehensive listing of official post-Idol releases by various contestants of the television show American Idol.

All of the compilations and singles of the show as well as most of its contestants' singles and albums were released by 19 Recordings with Sony Music Entertainment (the general record company associated and affiliated with the Idol series in most countries through its RCA/Jive Label Group) from 2002–2010 and with Universal Music Group (through its Interscope-Geffen-A&M Label Group) from 2011 onwards.

The first winner Kelly Clarkson remains the best-selling contestant worldwide with 25 million albums sold followed by fourth winner Carrie Underwood (best-selling contestant in the United States) with 15 million albums sold worldwide.

By the end of 2009, contestants had a total of 257 number one singles in the Billboard charts and have sold over 66 million albums worldwide and 56 million singles in US alone

Season 1
American Idol: Greatest Moments

Kelly Clarkson

 "Before Your Love" / "A Moment Like This"
Thankful
"Miss Independent"
"Low"
"The Trouble with Love Is"
Breakaway
"Breakaway"
"Since U Been Gone"
"Behind These Hazel Eyes"
"Because of You"
"Walk Away"
My December
"Never Again"
"Sober"
"One Minute"
"Don't Waste Your Time"
"Because of You" 
All I Ever Wanted
"My Life Would Suck Without You"
"I Do Not Hook Up"
"Already Gone"
"All I Ever Wanted"
"Don't You Wanna Stay" 
Stronger
"Mr. Know It All
"Stronger (What Doesn't Kill You)"
"Dark Side"
"I'll Be Home for Christmas"
Greatest Hits: Chapter One
"Catch My Breath"
"Don't Rush" 
"People Like Us"
"Tie It Up"
Wrapped in Red
"Underneath the Tree"
"Wrapped in Red"
"PrizeFighter" 
Piece by Piece
"Heartbeat Song"
"Invincible"
"Piece by Piece"
"Second Hand Heart " 
"Softly and Tenderly" 
"This Is For My Girls"
Meaning of Life
"Love So Soft" / "Move You"
"I Don't Think About You"
"Heat"
"Christmas Eve"
"Broken & Beautiful"
"I Dream in Southern" 
"I Would've Loved You" 
"I Dare You"
"Under the Mistletoe" 
"All I Want For Christmas Is You"
When Christmas Comes Around...
"Christmas Isn't Canceled (Just You)"
"Glow" 
"Santa, Can't You Hear Me"

Justin Guarini

 The Midnight Voices
 Justin Guarini
 "Unchained Melody"
 "Sorry"
 Stranger Things Have Happened
 "Did You Know That I Know Your Journey?"
 "Everlasting"
 Revolve (EP)

Nikki McKibbin

 Unleashed
 "To Be with You"
 "The Lie"
 "Naked Inside"
 "Save What's Left of Me"
 "Cry Little Sister"
 "Here to There"
 "Inconsolable"
 "Made it" (Featuring The League)
 Psychotrip (EP) ( with Love Stricken Demise)
 "Celebrity High"

Tamyra Gray
 The Dreamer
 "Raindrops Will Fall"

RJ Helton
 Real Life
 "Even If"
 "My Devotion"

Ryan Starr
 "My Religion"
 "Love Gone Bad"
 "Stranded"
 "7am"
 "Eyes of a Child"
 "Blue"
 "Broken"

AJ Gil

 "She's Hot"
 Love Me Later
 Life, Death & Resurrection
 "I Live"

Jim Verraros

 Unsaid and Understood
 Rollercoaster
 "You Turn It On"
 "I Want You"
 "You're Getting Crazy"
 "Outside"
 "Welcome to Hollywood"
 Do Not Disturb
 "Touch (Don't U Want 2)"
 "Electric Love"
 "Do Not Disturb"

Other contestants
Voyces United for UNHCR (Brad Estrin – Album, 2006)
Human Again (Adriel Herrera – Album)
Numb (Angela Peel – Album, 2007)

Season 2
 American Idol Season 2: All-Time Classic American Love Songs
 "God Bless the USA"
 "What the World Needs Now"

Ruben Studdard

 "Flying Without Wings" / "Superstar"
 Soulful
 "Sorry 2004"
 "What If"
 I Need an Angel
 "I Need an Angel"
 The Return
 "Change Me"
 "Make Ya Feel Beautiful"
 "Celebrate Me Home"
 Love Is
 "Together"
 "Don't Make 'Em Like U No More"
 Playlist: The Very Best of Ruben Studdard
 Letters from Birmingham
 "June 28th (I'm Single)"

Clay Aiken

 "Bridge over Troubled Water" / "This Is the Night"
 Measure of a Man
 "Invisible"
 "The Way" / "Solitaire"
 "I Will Carry You"
 "Measure of a Man"
 Merry Christmas with Love
 "Winter Wonderland"
 "O Holy Night"
 "Hark the Herald Angels Sing / O Come All Ye Faithful"
 "Have Yourself a Merry Little Christmas"
 "Mary, Did You Know?"
 A Thousand Different Ways
 "Without You"
 "A Thousand Days"
 All Is Well: Songs for Christmas (EP)
 On My Way Here
 "On My Way Here"
 The Very Best of Clay Aiken
 Tried and True

Kimberley Locke
 One Love
 "8th World Wonder"
 "Wrong"
 "Coulda Been"
 "I Could"
 Based on a True Story
 "Change"
 "Band of Gold"
 "Fall"
 Christmas
 "Up on the House Top"
 "Jingle Bells"
 "Frosty the Snowman"
 "We Need a Little Christmas"
 "Strobelight"
 Four for the Floor
 "Finally Free"

Josh Gracin
 Josh Gracin
 "I Want to Live"
 "Nothin' to Lose"
 "Stay with Me (Brass Bed)"
 We Weren't Crazy
 "Favorite State of Mind"
 "I Keep Coming Back"
 "We Weren't Crazy"
 "Unbelievable (Ann Marie)"
 "Telluride"
 Redemption
 "Enough"
 "She's a Different Kind of Crazy"
 "Over Me"
 "Cover Girl"
 "Long Way to Go"

Carmen Rasmusen
 Carmen (EP)
 "Photograph"
 Nothin' Like the Summer
 "Nothin' Like the Summer"

Kimberly Caldwell
 "Who Will You Run To"
 "Fear of Flying"
 Without Regret
 "Mess of You"
 "Desperate Girls & Stupid Boys"
 "On the Weekend"
 "Tied Together"
 "Doin' Me Right"

Corey Clark
 Corey Clark

Charles Grigsby
 Charles Grigsby (EP)

Vanessa Olivarez
 "The One"
 The One (The Remixes)
 "As Vain As You"
 Butterfly Stitch EP
 Butterfly Stitch – Live at The Loft

Others
Quiana Parler
 Use Your Gift
Jordan Segundo
 Jordan
George Trice
 George Trice

Season 3
 American Idol Season 3: Greatest Soul Classics

Fantasia Barrino

 "I Believe"
 Free Yourself
 "Truth Is"
 "Baby Mama"
 "Free Yourself"
 "Ain't Gon' Beg You"
 Fantasia
 "Hood Boy"
 "When I See U"
 "Only One U"
 Back to Me
 "Even Angels"
 "Bittersweet"
 Side Effects of You
 "Lose to Win"
 "Without Me"
 "Side Effects of You"
 The Definition Of...
 "No Time for It"
 "Sleeping with the One I Love"
 "When I Met You"
 Christmas After Midnight
 Sketchbook
 "Enough"
 "PTSD"

Diana DeGarmo

 "Dreams"
 Blue Skies
 "Emotional"

Jasmine Trias

 "Love 'Ko To"
 Jasmine Trias
 "Excuses"
 "Lose Control"
 "Sana Lagi"
 "Kung Paano"
 "I'd Rather"
 "The Christmas Song"

LaToya London
 Love & Life
 "Appreciate" / "Every Part of Me" / "All By Myself"
 "State of My Heart"

George Huff
 My Christmas EP (EP)
 "Go Tell It on the Mountain"
 Miracles
 "Brighter Day"
 "Miracles"
 "You Know Me"
 George Huff
 "Don't Let Go"

John Stevens
 Red
 "Come Fly with Me"

Jennifer Hudson

 "And I Am Telling You I'm Not Going"
 Jennifer Hudson
 "Spotlight"
 "The Star-Spangled Banner"
 "If This Isn't Love"
 "Giving Myself"
 I Remember Me
 "Where You At"
 "I Remember Me"
 "No One Gonna Love You"
 "I Got This"
 JHUD
 "I Can't Describe (The Way I Feel)"
 "Walk It Out"
 "It's Your World"
 "I Still Love You"

Jon Peter Lewis
 "Turn to Grey"
 Stories from Hollywood
 "Stories from Hollywood"
 "It's Christmas"
 "If I Go Away/Man Like Me"
 Break the Silence
 Jon Peter Lewis (EP)
 "Crazy Love"

Camile Velasco
 "Hangin On"
 "Guava Jelly" (feat. Stephen Marley)
 Koy
 "Super Star"

Leah LaBelle
 "Sexify"
 "Lolita"
 "What Do We Got To Lose?"
 Love to the Moon (EP)

William Hung
 Inspiration
 Hung for the Holidays
 Miracle: Happy Summer from William Hung

Others
Kiera Bivens
 Love, Lipstick and Poetry
Lisa Leuschner
 Sing Me Home
 Reality
Dina Lopez
 Str8up Band
Lana Phillips
 Love, Lana
John Preator
 I'll Be Seeing You
Alan Ritchson
 This Is Next Time
Donnie Williams
 Just Like Magic
Lisa Wilson
 Sun Shiney Day

Season 4
 American Idol Season 4: The Showstoppers

Carrie Underwood

"Inside Your Heaven" / "Independence Day"
Some Hearts
"Jesus, Take the Wheel"
"Some Hearts"
"Don't Forget to Remember Me"
"Before He Cheats"
"Wasted"
"I'll Stand by You"
Carnival Ride
"So Small"
"All-American Girl"
"Last Name"
"Just a Dream"
"I Told You So"
"Praying for Time"
"Just Stand Up!" 
"Home Sweet Home"
Play On
"Cowboy Casanova"
"Temporary Home"
"Undo It"
"Mama's Song"
"Remind Me" 
Blown Away
"Good Girl"
"Blown Away"
"Two Black Cadillacs"
"See You Again"
"Somethin' Bad" 
Greatest Hits: Decade Number 1
 "Something in the Water"
 "Little Toy Guns"
Storyteller
"Smoke Break"
"Heartbeat"
"Chaser"
"Church Bells"
"Dirty Laundry"
"Forever Country" 
"The Fighter" 
"The Champion" 
Cry Pretty
"Cry Pretty"
"Love Wins"
"Southbound"
"Drinking Alone"
My Gift
"Hallelujah" 
"Tears of Gold" 
"I Wanna Remember" 
"If I Didn't Love You"

Bo Bice
 "I Don't Want to Be"
 "Inside Your Heaven" / "Vehicle"
 The Real Thing
 "The Real Thing"
 "U Make Me Better"
 "Blades of Glory"
 See the Light
 "Witness"
 3
 "You Take Yourself with You"

Vonzell Solomon
 My Struggle

Constantine Maroulis
 Constantine

Nadia Turner
 "Standing on Love"

Nikko Smith
 Revolution

Jessica Sierra
 Deepest Secret EP

Others
Judd Harris
 Fly (with Visible from Space)

Jeff Johnson
 Enter In
 Glorious Day

Jamie Paul Koehler
 It's Christmas TimeMelinda Lira
 Melinda

Sarah Mather
 Another Day

Kurtis Parks
 Something for Everyone

Elizabeth Pha (aka Chandara)
 The Moon & the Stars

Celena Rae
 Invisible Woman

Mario Vazquez
 Mario Vazquez
 "Gallery"

Jared Yates
 All That I Am

Season 5
 American Idol Season 5: Encores

Taylor Hicks

 "Do I Make You Proud" / "Takin' It to the Streets"
 Taylor Hicks "Just to Feel That Way"
 "Heaven Knows"
 The Distance "What's Right Is Right"
 "Seven Mile Breakdown"

Katharine McPhee
 "Think"
 "Somewhere Over the Rainbow" / "My Destiny"
 Katharine McPhee "Over It"
 "Love Story"
 Unbroken "Had It All"
 Christmas Is the Time to Say I Love You "Have Yourself a Merry Little Christmas"

Elliott Yamin
 "Moody's Mood for Love"
 "This Christmas"
 Elliott Yamin "Movin' On"
 "Wait for You"
 "One Word (Elliott Yamin song)"
 "Home"
 "In Love With You Forever"
 Sounds of the Season: The Elliott Yamin Holiday Collection "Warm Me Up"
 My Kind of Holiday Fight for Love
 "Fight for Love
 "You Say"
 "Can't Keep on Loving You (From a Distance)"

Chris Daughtry with Daughtry

 "Wanted Dead or Alive (Bon Jovi song)"
 Daughtry "It's Not Over"
 "Home"
 "What I Want"
 "Over You"
 "Crashed"
 "Feels Like Tonight"
 "What About Now"
 Leave This Town "No Surprise"
 "You Don't Belong"
 "Life After You"
 "September"
 Break the Spell "Renegade"
 "Crawling Back to You"
 "Outta My Head"
 "Start of Something Good"
 Baptized "Waiting for Superman"
 "Long Live Rock 'n Roll"
 "Battleships"

Paris Bennett
 "Midnight Train to Georgia"
 Princess P "Ordinary Love"
 "Duet"
 "My Boyfriend's Back" (Promo only)

Kellie Pickler

 Small Town Girl "Red High Heels"
 "I Wonder"
 "Things That Never Cross a Man's Mind"
 Kellie Pickler "Don't You Know You're Beautiful"
 "Best Days of Your Life"
 "Didn't You Know How Much I Loved You"
 "Makin' Me Fall in Love Again"
 100 Proof "Tough"
 "100 Proof"

Ace Young
 "Father Figure"
 "Scattered"
 Ace Young "Addicted"

Bucky Covington
 Bucky Covington "A Different World"
 "It's Good to Be Us"
 "I'll Walk"
 I'm Alright "I Want My Life Back"
 "Gotta Be Somebody"
 "A Father's Love (The Only Way He Knew How)"
 TBD Album "I Wanna Be That Feeling"

Mandisa

 True Beauty "Only the World"
 "God Speaking"
 "Voice of a Savior"
 Christmas Joy EP
 "Christmas Makes Me Cry"
 It's Christmas
 "Christmas Day"
 "Angels We Have Heard on High"
 "Lose My Soul"
 Freedom "My Deliverer"
 "He Is with You"
 What If We Were Real "Stronger"
 "Good Morning"

Others
Bobby "Bluu Suede" Bullard
 The Bluu Suede Project

Ayla Brown
 Forward (LP)

Patrick Hall
 One for the Ages (LP)

Josh Royse
 Memories

David Radford
 Swing on By (LP)

Stevie Scott
 Stevie Scott (EP)

Brianna Taylor
 Brianna Taylor (EP)
 Fireworks at the Fairground

Stephanie White
 Knee Deep InSanity

Season 6
 American Idol Season 6: Greatest Hits

Jordin Sparks

 Jordin Sparks (EP)
 "This Is My Now"
  Jordin Sparks "Tattoo"
 "No Air" (w/ Chris Brown) 
 "One Step at a Time"
 Battlefield "Battlefield"
 "S.O.S (Let the Music Play)"

Blake Lewis
 Blake Lewis (EP)
 "You Give Love a Bad Name"
 A.D.D. (Audio Day Dream) "Break Anotha"
 "How Many Words"
 Heartbreak on Vinyl "Sad Song"
 "Heartbreak on Vinyl"
 "Till' We See the Sun"
 Portrait of a Chameleon "Your Touch"

Melinda Doolittle
 Melinda Doolittle (EP)
 "My Funny Valentine"
 "It's Your Love"
 Coming Back to YouLaKisha Jones
 LaKisha Jones (EP)
 So Glad I'm Me "Let's Go Celebrate"

Chris Richardson
 Chris Richardson (EP)
 Come Right Back to You "All Alone"
 "Far Away" (as featured artist)

Phil Stacey
 Phil Stacey (EP)
 Phil Stacey "If You Didn't Love Me"
 Into the Light "Old Glory"
 "Inside Out"
 "You're Not Shaken"
 "Some Kind of Love"

Sanjaya Malakar
 Dancing to the Music in My HeadHaley Scarnato
 StrongHeart "Girls Night Out"

Gina Glocksen
 Gina Glocksen – EP

Chris Sligh
 Running Back to You "Empty Me"
 "Arise"

Stephanie Edwards
 "On Our Way"
 "Here I Am"

Brandon Rogers
 AutomaticOthers
Sarah Burgess
 One
 "Dangerouz"
 "I'm So Crushed"
 Didn't Matter That

Amanda Coluccio
 "Fly Away"
 "Now That I Found You"

Sean Michel
 The Thrill of Hope

Sherman Pore
 For My Lady Love

Season 7
David Cook

 "Dream Big"
 "I Still Haven't Found What I'm Looking For"
 "The World I Know"
 "I Don't Want to Miss a Thing"
 "Billie Jean"
 "Always Be My Baby"
 "Hello"
 "The Music of the Night"
 "Eleanor Rigby"
 "I'm Alive"
 "Little Sparrow"
 "Hungry Like the Wolf"
 "Innocent"
 "Day Tripper"
 "All Right Now"
 "Happy Together" (Originally by The Turtles)
 David Cook "The Time of My Life"
 "Light On"
 "Bar-ba-sol"
 "Come Back to Me"
 "Permanent"
 This Loud Morning "The Last Goodbye" 
 "Fade into Me"
 "The Last Song I'll Write for You"
 "Laying Me Low"
 Digital Vein "Criminals"
 "Broken Windows"
 "Heartbeat"
 Chromance' "Gimmie Heartbreak"
 "Death of Me"
 The Looking Glass "Red Turns Blue"
 "Strange World"
 "Fire"

David Archuleta

 "Imagine"
 "Don't Let the Sun Go Down on Me"
 "In This Moment"
 "Longer"
 "Think of Me"
 "Angels"
 David Archuleta "Crush"
 "A Little Too Not Over You"
 "Touch My Hand"
 Christmas from the Heart 
 The Other Side of Down "Something 'Bout Love"
 "Elevator"
 Begin No Matter How FarJason Castro
 "Hallelujah"
 "Over the Rainbow"
 "White Christmas"
 The Love Uncompromised EP (EP)
 "Let's Just Fall in Love Again"
 Jason Castro "That's What I'm Here For"
 "Over the Rainbow"
 Who I Am "You Are"
 Only a MountainBrooke White
 High Hopes and Heart Break (2009)
 "Hold Up My Heart"
 "Radio Radio"
 Gemini EP (as part of Jack and White) (2011)
 Winter EP (as part of Jack and White) (2012)

Carly Smithson with We Are the Fallen
 Tear the World Down "Bury Me Alive"

Kristy Lee Cook
 Why Wait "15 Minutes of Shame"

Michael Johns
 Hold Back My Heart "Heart on My Sleeve"

Ramiele Malubay
 "We Are One (This Christmas)"
 "Kaya"
 "More to Me"
 "Here I Am"

Amanda Overmyer
 Solidify "Play On"
 "Love Me Like You Want"

Josiah Leming
 Angels Undercover EP
 Punk Ass Rain EP
 Come On Kid Another LifeSeason 8

Kris Allen

 Season 8 Favorite Performances "Heartless"
 "Ain't No Sunshine"
 "Apologize"
 "Falling Slowly"
 "What's Going On"
 "Make You Feel My Love"
 "No Boundaries"
 "Let It Be"
 Kris Allen "Live Like We're Dying"
 "The Truth (with Pat Monahan)
 "Alright with Me"
 Thank You Camellia "The Vision of Love"
 Horizons "Prove It to You" (feat. Lenachka)

Adam Lambert

 Season 8 Favorite Performances "Mad World"
 "A Change Is Gonna Come"
 "One"
 "Cryin'"
 "Slow Ride" (with Allison Iraheta)
 "The Tracks of My Tears"
 "Feeling Good"
 "No Boundaries"
 Take One For Your Entertainment "For Your Entertainment"
 "Whataya Want from Me"
 "Time for Miracles"
 "If I Had You"
 Trespassing "Better Than I Know Myself"
 "Never Close Our Eyes"

Danny Gokey
 Non-album song "You Are So Beautiful"
 My Best Days "My Best Days Are Ahead of Me"
 "I Will Not Say Goodbye"
 Non-album song "Second Hand Heart"

Allison Iraheta
 "Slow Ride" (with Adam Lambert)
 Just like You "Friday I'll Be Over U"
 "Scars"
 "Don't Waste the Pretty"

Anoop Desai
 All Is Fair "My Name"
 Zero.0Scott MacIntyre
 HeartstringsMichael Sarver
 Michael Sarver "You Are"
 "Cinderella Girl"
 "Ferris Wheel"
 ChristmasSeason 9
American Idol Season 9

Lee DeWyze
 "Beautiful Day"
 "Hallelujah"
 "Falling Slowly" (with Crystal Bowersox)
 "The Boxer"
 "Everybody Hurts"
 Live It Up "Sweet Serendipity"
 "Beautiful Like You"
 Frames "Silver Lining"
 "Fight"

Crystal Bowersox

 "Up to the Mountain"
 "Falling Slowly" (with Lee DeWyze)
 "Black Velvet"
 "Me and Bobby McGee"
 Farmer's Daughter "Farmer's Daughter"
 "Ridin' with the Radio"

Casey James
 "Let's Don't Call It a Night"
 "Crying on a Suitcase"

Aaron Kelly
 "I Can't Wait for Christmas"

Tim UrbanHeart of Me"Heart of Me"

Siobhan MagnusMoonbaby"Beatrice Dream"
"Black Doll"

Andrew Garcia
 "Crazy"

Todrick Hall
Somebody's Christmas
MTV's Todrick: The Music, Vol. 1Straight Outta Oz"Low"ForbiddenHaus Party, Pt. 1"Glitter"
"Nails, Hair, Hips, Heels"
"I Like Boys"Haus Party, Pt. 2"Nails, Hair, Hips, Heels"
"Wig"
"Fag"
"Dripeesha"
"Y.A.S."Quarantine Queen"Mask, Gloves, Soap, Scrubs"
'Haus Party, Pt. 3"Blue"
"Pink Dreams"Femuline"Boys in the Ocean"
"Rainin' Fellas"

Tori KellyHandmade Songs"Confetti"Foreword"Dear No One"Unbreakable Smile"Nobody Love"
"Should've Been Us"Hiding Place"Help Us to Love"
"Never Alone"
"Psalm 42"Inspired by True Events"Change Your Mind"
"Sorry Would Go A Long Way"
"Language"Solitude"Time Flies"
"Unbothered"A Tori Kelly Christmas"Let It Snow"
"25th"

Season 10

Scotty McCreery
 American Idol Season 10: Scotty McCreery American Idol Season 10 Highlights: Scotty McCreery EP
 Clear as Day "I Love You This Big"
 "The Trouble with Girls"
 "Water Tower Town"
 Christmas with Scotty McCreery See You Tonight "See You Tonight"
 "Feelin' It"

Lauren Alaina
 American Idol Season 10: Lauren Alaina American Idol Season 10 Highlights: Lauren Alaina EP
 Wildflower "Like My Mother Does"
 "Georgia Peaches"
 "Eighteen Inches"
 "Barefoot and Buckwild"
  Road Less Traveled
 "Next Boyfriend"
 "Road Less Traveled"
 "Doin' Fine"

Haley Reinhart
 American Idol Season 10 Highlights: Haley Reinhart EP
"Baby, It's Cold Outside" (with Casey Abrams)Listen Up!"Free"

James Durbin
 American Idol Season 10 Highlights: James Durbin EP
 Memories of a Beautiful Disaster"Stand Up"
"Love Me Bad"
"HIgher Than Heaven

Casey Abrams
 Casey Abrams"Get Out"
"Simple Life"

Stefano Langone (as Stefano)
 "I'm on a Roll"
 "Yes to Love"

Pia Toscano
 "This Time"

Thia Megia
 "One Day"

Naima Adedapo
 Untitled EP
 'Free Your Mind"

Ashthon Jones
 "Lookout"

Tim Halperin
 Rise and Fall
 "The Last Song"

Chris Medina
 What Are Words
 "What Are Words"

Season 11

Phillip Phillips
 Phillip Phillips: Journey to the Finale
 American Idol Season 11 Highlights
 The World from the Side of the Moon
 "Home"
 "Gone, Gone, Gone"

Jessica Sanchez
 "Change Nothing"
 Jessica Sanchez: Journey to the Finale
 American Idol Season 11 Highlights
 Me, You & the Music
 "Tonight"

Joshua Ledet
 American Idol Season 11 Highlights

Hollie Cavanagh
 American Idol Season 11 Highlights
 "Outer Limit"

Skylar Laine
 American Idol Season 11 Highlights
 "Settle Down"

Elise Testone
 In This Life
 "I Will Not Break"

Colton Dixon
 A Messenger
 "Never Gone"
 "You Are"

DeAndre Brackensick
 "Her Crazy"

Heejun Han (as HeeJun)
 "Bring the Love Back"

Erika Van Pelt
 My Independence
 "Listen, Learn, Then Delete"

Season 12

Candice Glover
 Music Speaks
 "I Am Beautiful"
 "Cried"

Kree Harrison
 "All Cried Out"

Angie Miller
 "You Set Me Free
 "This Christmas Song"
 Weathered

Janelle Arthur
 "What You Asked For"

Paul Jolley
 "Healed"

Season 13

Caleb Johnson
 Testify
 "As Long as You Love Me"
 "Only One"
 "Fighting Gravity"
 Born from Southern Ground (credited as Caleb Johnson & the Ramblin' Saints)
 "Holding On"
 "Hanging with the Band"

Jena Irene Asciutto
 "We Are One" (credited as Jena Irene)
 "Unbreakable" 
 Innocence
 Cold Fame

Alex Preston
 "The Light Was Already Here"
 Alex Preston
 A Work in Progress

Jessica Meuse
 "Done"
 "Rio Grande"
 Halfhearted

Sam Woolf
 Pretend

CJ Harris
 "In Love"

Dexter Roberts
 Dream About Me
 "Dream About Me"
 Dexter Roberts Unplugged, Vol. 1

Majesty Rose
Bloom
"Plunge"
"People Hold On"

MK Nobilette
"Make Believe"

Ben Briley
 Outlier

Emily Piriz
 "One of Those Nights"

Queen Burns as Queen Naija
"Medicine"
"Karma"
Queen Naija EP
"Butterflies"
"War Cry"
"Away From You"
"Good Morning Text"Missunderstood'"Butterflies Pt. 2"
"Pack Lite"
"Lie to Me"
"Set Him Up"

Remi WolfYou're a Dog"Guy"
"Sauce"
"Shawty"I'm Allergic to Dogs!"Woo!"
"Photo ID"
"Disco Man"
"Hello Hello Hello"Juno"Liquor Store"
"Quiet on Set"
"Grumpy Old Man"
"Guerrilla"
"Sexy Villain"
"Anthony Kiedis"
"Front Tooth"

Season 14

Nick FradianiHurricane "Beautiful Life"

Clark Beckham

 "Champion"

Jax
 "Forcefield"
 "La La Land"

Rayvon Owen
 "Air"

Adanna Duru
 "Transparent Soul"

Season 15

Trent HarmonTrent HarmonFallingThere's a GirlYou Got 'Em AllYou Got 'Em AllLa'Porsha RenaeAlready All ReadyGood WomanAlready All ReadySeason 16

Maddie PoppeWhirlwindGoing Going GoneKeep On Movin On'Made You MissFirst Aid KitLittle ThingsCaleb Lee HutchinsonJohnny Cash HeartGabby BarrettRiver DeepI HopeSeason 17
Laine HardyFlameSeason 18
Just SamAfricando''

References

 
 
Pop music discographies
Contemporary R&B discographies